Esmond Penington Knight (4 May 1906 – 23 February 1987) was an English actor. He had a successful stage and film career before World War II. For much of his later career Knight was half-blind. He had been badly wounded in 1941 while on active service on board HMS Prince of Wales when she fought the Bismarck at the Battle of the Denmark Strait, and remained totally blind for two years, though he later regained some sight in his right eye.

Childhood
Knight was born on 4 May 1906 in East Sheen Surrey, the third son of Francis and Bertha Knight. His father was involved in the family cigar import business. He was educated at Willington Preparatory School in Putney and then Westminster School.

Early career
He was an accomplished actor with a career spanning over half a century. He established himself in the 1920s on stage. In John Gielgud's 1930 production of Hamlet he played Rosencrantz. He also appeared in films. In Romany Love (1931) he played "a swaggering gypsy who never stopped singing". For The Private Life of Henry VIII (1933), Knight and his uncle C. W. R. Knight trained the falcons used in the hunting scenes. In Alfred Hitchcock's Waltzes from Vienna (1934), he played the lead role as Johann Strauss. Following this, he landed a number of roles in Hollywood films. He travelled to Germany to star in Black Roses (originally , 1935), a film about a Finnish anti-communist. The film was shot in three versions, in English (as Did I Betray?), German, and French. Julius Streicher visited the set during filming. Thereafter Knight appeared in various film and theatre productions in Britain.

Military service
After war was declared, Knight continued to act, appearing in Powell and Pressburger's film Contraband (1940). He sought a naval commission, but after the evacuation of Dunkirk he became involved in training Local Defence Volunteers. In late 1940, he was accepted for naval training. In 1941, Knight was asked to play the lead role of fanatical Nazi Lieutenant Hirth in another Powell and Pressburger propaganda film 49th Parallel (1941), but Eric Portman took the role as Knight was required for military training. He did appear in This England (also 1941), another propaganda film.

After completing his Naval training, Knight was appointed, with the rank of sub lieutenant, RNVR, to the battleship HMS Prince of Wales. In 1941, the ship received orders to pursue the German battleship Bismarck and the heavy cruiser Prinz Eugen. In the ensuing Battle of the Denmark Strait, Knight witnessed the sinking of HMS Hood before being blinded by shrapnel. A shell fired by Bismarck either passed through the bridge of the Prince of Wales and did not explode or it exploded near the ship. Either way fragments from the ship's superstructure hit Knight in the face causing him to lose an eye and leaving the other severely damaged.

Recuperation
Though blind, Knight insisted that he would continue his acting career. During this period, he dictated an early autobiography to his secretary, Annabella Cloudsley, Seeking the Bubble (Hutchinson & Co. 1943). Knight continued to act in radio productions. Though still totally blind, he also appeared on film, once more as a Nazi villain, in Powell and Pressburger's The Silver Fleet (1943).

During 1943, Knight received a series of treatments from Dr Vincent Nesfield designed to restore sight to his remaining eye. The treatment was a great success, restoring much of Knight's sight. The partial return of his sight made a major difference to his career. He appeared briefly in another Powell and Pressburger film, playing the roles of the village idiot and the "Seven Sisters Soldier" in A Canterbury Tale (1944), also adding the voice-over reading of Chaucer. His major breakthrough back into the mainstream came when he was cast as Fluellen, the brave but eccentric Welsh officer in Laurence Olivier's version of Henry V (1944).

Later career
Knight continued to work with Olivier and with Powell and Pressburger, appearing in the former's Shakespearean films Hamlet (1948) and Richard III (1955). For the latter, he appeared in Black Narcissus (1947) and The Red Shoes (1948). He also starred in Jean Renoir's The River (1951).

Knight was the subject of a This Is Your Life episode in 1957 when he was surprised by Eamonn Andrews at the King's Theatre in Hammersmith, London.

In the film Sink the Bismarck! (1960), he played John Leach, the captain of HMS Prince of Wales, the ship in which he had been serving when he was blinded (though the captain is not named in the film). In the same year he played Jack Cade in the BBC Shakespeare series An Age of Kings.

He starred as Professor Ernest Reinhart in the British science fiction television series A for Andromeda (1961), alongside Patricia Kneale and Peter Halliday.

In Robin and Marian (1976), a film directed by Richard Lester, he played a blind old man who defies Richard I of England. For the role, Knight removed his glass eye.

Personal life
Knight was married twice. He married actress Frances Clare in 1929. The couple had a daughter, actress Rosalind Knight.

During the 1930s, he had a long-running affair with Nora Swinburne, of which his wife was aware. She was also an actress who appeared with him in several stage plays. After a short-lived attempt to end the affair, Knight left Frances for Nora. The couple married in 1946 and remained together until his death.

Death
Knight died of a heart attack in London	on 23 February 1987.

Work

Stage
 The Wild Duck – Pax Robertson's Salon, London (1925)
 Various Shakespeare productions – full season, Old Vic (1926)
 Everyman – The Old Vic, London (1926)
 Various productions – Children's Theatre, London (1928)
 Hamlet – Queen's Theatre, London (with John Gielgud and Donald Wolfit) (1930)
 Full Season – King's Theatre, Hammersmith (1939)
 Full Season – Royal Shakespeare Company, Stratford-upon-Avon (1948–1949)
 Caesar and Cleopatra – St James's Theatre, London (with Laurence Olivier, Peter Cushing and Vivien Leigh) (1951)
 The Emperor's New Clothes – Ethel Barrymore Theatre, New York (with Lee J. Cobb) (1953)
 Full Season – The Old Vic, London (1962–1963)
 Agincourt – The Archer's Tale – Royal Exchange Theatre, Manchester (one man show) (1973)
 The Family Reunion – Royal Exchange Theatre, Manchester (with Edward Fox) (1973 & 1979)
 Crime and Punishment adapted by Paul Bailey. Directed by Michael Elliott at the Royal Exchange, Manchester (1978)
 Moby-Dick – Royal Exchange Theatre, Manchester (with Brian Cox) (1983–1984)

Filmography

 The Blue Peter (1928) as Radio Operator (film debut)
 The Ringer (1931) as John Lenley
 77 Park Lane (1931) as Philip Connor
 Romany Love (1931) as Davy Summers
 The Bermondsey Kid (1933) as Eddie Martin
 Waltzes From Vienna (1934) as Johann Strauss
 Lest We Forget (1934) as Pat Doyle Jr.
 Father and Son (1934) as Michael Bolton
 Girls Will Be Boys (1934) as Geoffrey Dawson
 Dandy Dick (1935) as Tony Mardon
 Crime Unlimited (1935) as Pete Borden
 Someday (1935) as Curley Blake
 Pagliacci (1936) as Cadet Silvio
 The Vicar of Bray (1937) as Dennis Melross
 Weddings Are Wonderful (1938) as Guy Rogers
 The Arsenal Stadium Mystery (1939) as Raille – Trojan Team Member
 Contraband (1940) as Mr. Pidgeon
 Fingers (1941) as Sid Harris
 This England (1941) as Vicar's Son
 The Silver Fleet (1943) as Von Schiffer
 The Halfway House (1944) as David Davies
 A Canterbury Tale (1944) as Narrator (non-US versions)/Seven-Sisters Soldier/Village Idiot
 Henry V (1944) as Fluellen – Captain in the English Army
 Black Narcissus (1947) as The Old General
 Holiday Camp (1947) as Camp Announcer
 Uncle Silas (1947) as Dr. Bryerly
 The End of the River (1947) as Dantos
 Hamlet (1948) as Bernardo
 The Red Shoes (1948) as Livy
 Gone to Earth (1950) as Abel Woodus
 The River (1951) as The Father
 Girdle of Gold (1952) as Evans the Milk
 The Steel Key (1953) as Prof. Newman
 Richard III (1955) as Ratcliffe
 Helen of Troy (1956) as High Priest
 The Prince and the Showgirl (1957) as Hoffman
 Battle of the V-1 (1958) as Stricker
 Sink the Bismarck! (1960) as Captain Leach (Prince of Wales)
 Peeping Tom (1960) as Arthur Baden
 Decision at Midnight (1963) as Peter Hauser
 The Spy Who Came in from the Cold (1965) as Old Judge
 The Winter's Tale (1967) as Camillo
 Where's Jack? (1969) as Ballad Singer
 Anne of the Thousand Days (1969) as Kingston
 Elizabeth R (1971) as Bishop de Quadra 
 The Boy Who Turned Yellow (1972) as Doctor
 Robin and Marian (1976) as Old Defender
 The Man in the Iron Mask (1977) as Armand
 Sir Henry at Rawlinson End (1980) (uncredited)
 A Voyage Round My Father (1982) as Judge 
 King Lear (1983) as Old Man 
 The Element of Crime (1984) as Osborne
 Sleeping Murder (1987) as Mr. Galbraith 
 Superman IV: The Quest for Peace (1987) as 2nd Elder (final film)

Television

 The Invisible Man (1959) as Wilson 
 An Age of Kings (1960) as Jack Cade 
 Deadline Midnight (1960) as Edward Lee
 A for Andromeda (1961) as Professor Ernest Reinhart
 Danger Man (1961) as Baron
 The Saint (1962) as Antoine Louvois 
 Z Cars (1969) as Albert Wallace
 Doctor Who – (The Space Pirates) (1969) as Dom Issigri
 The Rivals of Sherlock Holmes (1971) as Captain Cutler 
Public Eye (1972) - Many a Slip - as Dr Stowe
 Arthur of the Britons (1973) as Athel
 Fall of Eagles (1974) as General Ruzski
 I, Claudius (1976) as Domitius
 Return of the Saint (1978) as Paul Hanson
 Rebecca (1979) as Coroner 
 Romeo and Juliet (1980) as Old Capulet 
 Antony and Cleopatra (1981) as Lepidus 
 The Borgias (1981) as Cardinal Gian Battista Orsini
 I Remember Nelson (1982) as Elderly Guest
 My Cousin Rachel (1983) as Sam Bates
 The Invisible Man (1984) as Blind Man
 Fortunes of War (1987) as Liversage (last appearance)

References

External links

Official website

Esmond Knight at Aveleyman

1906 births
1987 deaths
English male film actors
English male stage actors
English male television actors
People from East Sheen
Royal Naval Volunteer Reserve personnel of World War II
20th-century English male actors
Male actors from Surrey
People educated at Westminster School, London